Village deities are a common feature of the Hindu pantheon of deities. They are known as Gramadevatas. Each Hindu region and caste of India and South Asia has its share of village deities. Sri Lankan Tamils venerate their own group of village deities throughout Sri Lanka, specifically in the Tamil-dominated north and east of the island nation.

List of Hindu deities

 Annamar is a deity of the Nalavar and Pallar caste.
Ayyanar, sometimes equated with Sasta is a popular deity in almost all villages. Aiyan is the Tamil name for Buddha and the Aiyanar deity was first syncretised with Buddha.
Elu Kanniyar take the form of seven virgins.
Kanakampikai Amman is the guardian goddess of the Vanni region.
Kannaki Amman is the chief deity of the coastal folk.
Kali, also Bhadrakali, is a popular female deity. Bhadrakali and also Vairavar (common deity in most villages) are both also worshipped in the form of the trishula.
Kattavarayan is a heroic saviour god and a deity of the Kōviars.
Naccimar is a women's goddess often conflated with Mariamman or Ampal, the mother Goddess.
Naka Tampiran, a form of Shiva is also common deity in most villages.
Periyatampiran, a form of Shiva is a caste deity of the Vannar
Valliyakkan, a Yaksha deity popular among the Paraiyars.
Varunan, the sea god, used as totem by the Karaiyars.
 Virumar, a form of Brahma is a deity of the Kollar and Tattar.
 Ilanthari

Sanskritisation

The identities of some of above the lesser known deities had been lost and most of them are now identified as Vairavar and Kali. Both are worshipped in the form of Trisulam. Furthermore, the Saiva revivalism initiated by Arumuga Navalar has enabled many high status Tamils to subsume the village deities within the Agamic pantheon. 

Similarly have some of the deities been Christianized under the colonial influences. As many coastal inhabitants were under Portuguese rule converted to Catholicism, were many coastal Kannaki Amman shrines converted to churches of Our Lady (a title of Mary, mother of Jesus).

See also
Religion in ancient Tamil country
Village deities of Tamil Nadu

References

External links
Village deities of Tamil Nadu

Lists of deities
Sri Lankan Tamil culture
Tamil deities
Tutelary deities